Government Pharmacy Institute, Patna is a pharmacy college situated in Patna, Bihar.

About college
It was established in 1958. Institute offers undergraduate and diploma courses in pharmacy. It is affiliated with Aryabhatta Knowledge University.

See also

References

External links
Official website
Aryabhatta Knowledge University

Colleges affiliated to Aryabhatta Knowledge University
Colleges of education in India
Universities and colleges in Patna
Educational institutions established in 1958
1958 establishments in Bihar